Dolní Hrachovice is a municipality and village in Tábor District in the South Bohemian Region of the Czech Republic. It has about 100 inhabitants.

Administrative parts
Villages of Horní Hrachovice and Mostek are administrative parts of Dolní Hrachovice.

References

Villages in Tábor District